Mohammed Tasiu Ibrahim (born 1 October 1961) is a retired Nigerian Army major general who served as the 27th Commandant of the Nigerian Defence Academy. He was appointed Commandant in July 2015 by the Chief of Army Staff, Maj-Gen Tukur Yusuf Buratai succeeding  Major General Muhammad Inuwa Idris

Background & education
Gen. Ibrahim was born on October 1, 1961 in Gumel, Jigawa State. He attended Gumel Gabas primary school in Gumel town and later completed his primary education in Tudun-jukun Primary School Zaria 1974. He proceeded to Government Secondary School Giwa, Zaria from 1974 to 1979 where he obtained his West African Senior School Certificate.

After working for a year (between 1979 and 1980) with First Bank of Nigeria in Kano he enrolled at the Nigerian Defence Academy as a member of the 29th Regular Combatant Course (including other officers such as Tukur Yusuf Buratai) from January 1981 to December 1983, when he received his commission into the Nigerian Army as a 2nd Lieutenant.

Career
Gen. Ibrahim served as the Chief of the Nigerian Army's Standard and Evaluation Department prior to his appointment as Commandant of the NDA. He retired from the Nigerian Army in October 2017.

Units and formations served
Defunct 41 Mech Bn - 1983 to 1986
Depot NA – 1986 to 1994
HQ 13 Bde – 1994 to 1995
SO2 Recruitment Kaduna State – 1995 to 1999
Coy Comd 5 Bn – 1999
AFCSC S1 list – 1999 to 2000
Nigerian Military School – 2000 to 2001
NIBATT 8 (195 Bn) – 2001 to 2002 
Infantry Corp Centre and School – 2002 to 2003
AHQ DOA – 2003 to 2004
82 Demo Bn – 2004 to 2006
NASI, SWW – ICCS 2006 to 2008
Amphibious Training School 2010 to 2013
HQ 1 Bde – 2013 to 2015
AHQ DAPP – 28 Jan to 27 Apr 2015
AHQ CASE – 27 Apr to 30 Jul 2015

Appointments
Adjutant/IO 41 Bn.
PL Comd/Instr Depot NA.
GSO3 Trg Ops 13 Bde.
DAQ 13 Bde.
SO2 Recruitment Kaduna State
Coy Comd 5 Bn.
Senior Instructor NMS.
Bn 2ic NIBATT 8 UNAMSIL (195 Bn).
Senior Instructor/CO Admin ICCS.
SO1 Record AHQ DOAA.
CO 82 Demo Bn. 
Chief Instructor SWW-ICCS.
Comdt ATS – 2010 to 2012
Comd HQ 1 Bde – 2013 to 2015
Director of Policy – 28 Jan to 27 Apr 2015
Chief of Army Standard and Evaluation – 27 Apr to 30 Jul 2015

References 

1961 births
Living people
Nigerian generals
Nigerian Army officers
Nigerian Defence Academy alumni
Nigerian Defence Academy people
Nigerian Defence Academy Commandants
People from Jigawa State